Notogrammitis heterophylla is a species of fern within the family polypodiaceae ferns. The species is found in New Zealand, Tasmania and Victoria, Australia. This plant is epiphytic In New Zealand's Westland N. heterophylla occurs in association with other epiphytes such as Asplenium polyodon and Trichomanes reniforme.

References
 C. Michael Hogan. 2009. Crown Fern: Blechnum discolor, Globaltwitcher.com, ed. N. Stromberg
 I.G. Stone. 1960. Observations on the gametophytes of Grammitis billardieri Willd. and Ctenopteris heterophylla (Labill.) Tindale (Grammitidaceae), Australian Journal of Botany

Line notes

Polypodiaceae
Epiphytes
Ferns of New Zealand
Taxa named by Jacques Labillardière